"If My Heart Had Wings" is a song written by J. Fred Knobloch and Annie Roboff, and recorded by American country music singer Faith Hill.  It was released in January 2001 as the fourth and final single from her album Breathe.  The song peaked at number three on the Billboard Hot Country Singles & Tracks chart and number 39 on the Billboard Hot 100.

The song was later performed by Haley Scarnato during the sixth season of American Idol.

Track listing

Chart positions

Year-end charts

References

2001 singles
1999 songs
Faith Hill songs
Songs written by J. Fred Knobloch
Song recordings produced by Byron Gallimore
Warner Records Nashville singles
Songs written by Annie Roboff